A. Deivanayagam is an Indian politician and former Member of the Legislative Assembly of Tamil Nadu. He was elected to the Tamil Nadu Legislative Assembly as an Indian National Congress candidate from Madurai Central constituency in 1984, and 1991 elections and as a Tamil Maanila Congress (Moopanar) candidate in 1996 election.

References 

Indian National Congress politicians from Tamil Nadu
Living people
Tamil Maanila Congress politicians
Tamil Nadu MLAs 1996–2001
Year of birth missing (living people)
Tamil Nadu MLAs 1991–1996
Tamil Nadu MLAs 1985–1989